Scottish National Party leadership election may refer to:

 1967 Scottish National Party leadership election
 1969 Scottish National Party leadership election
 1979 Scottish National Party leadership election
 1990 Scottish National Party leadership election
 2000 Scottish National Party leadership election
 2003 Scottish National Party leadership election
 2004 Scottish National Party leadership election
 2014 Scottish National Party leadership election
 2023 Scottish National Party leadership election

See also
 Scottish National Party depute leadership election (disambiguation)